Istanbul railway station commonly refers to:

Sirkeci railway station, listed on some maps as Istanbul railway station
Haydarpaşa railway station